Ilmārs Verpakovskis (15 October 1958 – 6 February 2022) was a Latvian footballer who played as a midfielder. He spent the bulk of his career with the Latvian club FK Liepājas Metalurgs, and was the father of the Latvia national team's all-time top scorer, Māris Verpakovskis.

International career
Verpakovskis made three appearances for the Latvia national team from 1991–1992. His first two appearances were in the unofficial 1991 Baltic Cup. His final appearance was in Latvia's first ever FIFA recognized match, a 2–0 friendly loss to Romania on 8 April 1992.

Personal life and death
Verpakovskis was the father of Māris Verpakovskis, who became a renowned Latvian footballer. Verpakovskis managed his son in his brief stint as player-manager for FK Liepājas Metalurgs in 1994. The Verpakovskis were the only father-son pair to both play for the Latvia national football team. He died on 6 February 2022, at the age of 63.

References

External links
 
 Lietuvos Futbolas Profile

1958 births
2022 deaths
Footballers from Riga
Soviet footballers
Latvian footballers
Association football midfielders
Latvia international footballers
FK Liepājas Metalurgs players
Latvian Higher League players
Latvian football managers
FK Liepājas Metalurgs managers